Lukas Reuschenbach (born 16 January 1994) is a German sprint canoeist.

He participated at the 2018 ICF Canoe Sprint World Championships.

References

1994 births
German male canoeists
Living people
ICF Canoe Sprint World Championships medalists in kayak
Canoeists at the 2015 European Games
European Games competitors for Germany
Sportspeople from Oberhausen